Eleutherodactylus modestus is a species of frog in the family Eleutherodactylidae.
It is endemic to Mexico.
Its natural habitat is subtropical or tropical dry forests.
It is threatened by habitat loss.

References

modestus
Amphibians described in 1942
Taxonomy articles created by Polbot